The 2020 Pennsylvania Democratic presidential primary took place on June 2, 2020, after being postponed due to concerns about the COVID-19 pandemic, as one of eight delayed and regular primaries on the same day in the Democratic primaries for the 2020 presidential election. It was originally planned to take place on April 28, 2020, as one of several northeastern states in the "Acela primary". The Pennsylvania primary was a closed primary, with the state awarding 210 delegates, of whom 186 were pledged delegates allocated on the basis of the primary results.

Former vice president and presumptive nominee Joe Biden, who was born and raised in Pennsylvania, won the primary with more than 79% of the vote, earning another 151 delegates and helping him to cross the necessary majority of 1,991 delegates and officially win the Democratic nomination three days later during the vote count. Senator Bernie Sanders, who had suspended his campaign two months earlier but still competed for delegates, received around 18% of the vote and 35 delegates.

Procedure
Pennsylvania had planned to join several northeastern states, which are connected by the Acela train system, as part of a regional cluster, the "Acela primary", in holding primaries on April 28. The other states that would have voted on that day were Connecticut, Delaware, Maryland, New York, and Rhode Island. Due to the COVID-19 pandemic, on March 27 Governor Tom Wolf signed a bill postponing the primary to June 2 as Pennsylvania, Rhode Island, and Indiana did the same, while the three other states selected different dates. They voted alongside these three postponed states and four regularly scheduled contests in the District of Columbia, Montana, New Mexico and South Dakota.

Voting took place throughout the state from 7:00 a.m. until 8:00 p.m. In the closed primary, candidates had to meet a threshold of 15% at the congressional district or statewide level in order to be considered viable. The 186 pledged delegates to the 2020 Democratic National Convention were allocated proportionally on the basis of the results of the primary. Of these, between 4 and 14 were allocated to each of the state's 18 congressional districts and another 20 were allocated to party leaders and elected officials (PLEO delegates), in addition to 41 at-large delegates. Originally planned with 153 delegates, the final number included a 25% bonus of 33 additional delegates on the 100 district and 33 at-large delegates by the Democratic National Committee, 10% for the original April date, which belonged to Stage II on the primary timetable, and an additional 15% for the regional "Acela" cluster.

Voters chose district-level national convention delegates during the presidential primary, with no need for an additional confirmation by party bodies. If a presidential candidate listed fewer district delegate candidates for the national convention than had to be allocated based on the results of the primary, then the additional delegates would be named at the subsequent state convention. On July 18 (postponed from July 13), the state convention voted on the 41 at-large and 20 pledged PLEO delegates for the national convention. The delegation also included 24 unpledged PLEO delegates: 12 members of the Democratic National Committee, 10 members of Congress (one senator and 9 representatives), Governor Wolf, and former DNC Chair Ed Rendell.

Candidates
The following candidates appeared on the ballot in Pennsylvania:
Joe Biden
Tulsi Gabbard (withdrawn)
Bernie Sanders (withdrawn)
There was also an option for write-in votes, but their general amount was not tallied.

Polling

Results

See also
 2020 Pennsylvania elections
 2020 Pennsylvania Republican presidential primary
 Elections in Pennsylvania

Notes
Additional candidates

References

External links
The Green Papers delegate allocation summary
Pennsylvania Democratic Party delegate selection plan 
FiveThirtyEight Pennsylvania primary poll tracker

Pennsylvania Democratic
Democratic primary
2020
Pennsylvania Democratic